Han Taiwanese, Taiwanese Han, Taiwanese Han Chinese, or Han Chinese are Taiwanese people of full or partial ethnic Han descent. According to the Executive Yuan of Taiwan, they comprise 95 to 97 percent of the Taiwanese population, which also includes Austronesians and other non-Han people. Major waves of Han immigration occurred since the 17th century to the end of Chinese Civil War in 1949, with the exception of the Japanese colonial period (1895-1945). Han Taiwanese mainly speak three languages of Chinese: Mandarin, Hokkien and Hakka.

Definition
There is no simple uniform definition of Han Taiwanese, which are estimated to comprise 95 to 98 percent of the Taiwanese population. To determine if a Taiwanese is Han, common criteria include immigration background (from continental East Asia), using a Sinitic language as their mother tongue, and observance of traditional Han festivals. Sometimes a negative definition is employed, where Han people are those who are not non-Han.

Taiwanese Han ethnic groups include the Hoklo people and Hakka people that had arrived in Taiwan before World War II (sometimes called "benshengren"), as well those and other Han people that arrived shortly after World War II (sometimes called "waishengren"). The distinction between benshengren and waishengren is now less important due to intermarriages and the rise of a Taiwanese identity. In addition, there are Han Taiwanese that do not fall into the above categories, including the Puxian-speaking people in Wuqiu Township, Kinmen County, the Mindong-speaking people in Matzu, and various newly arrived Han immigrants.

Genetics
There is a belief that modern Taiwanese Han are genetically different from Chinese Han, which has been used as a basis for Taiwanese independence from China. This belief has been called the "myth of indigenous genes" by some researchers such as Shu-juo Chen and Hong-kuan Duan, who say that "genetic studies have never supported the idea that Taiwanese Han are genetically different with Chinese Han." Some descendants of plains aborigines have opposed the usage of their ancestors in the call for Taiwanese independence. Genetic studies show genetic differences between Taiwanese Han and mountain aborigines. According to Chen and Duan, the genetic ancestry of individuals cannot be traced with certainty and attempts to construct identity through genetics are "theoretically meaningless." In the highest self reports, 5.3 percent of Taiwan's population claimed indigenous heritage.

Estimates of genetic indigenous ancestry range from 13%, 26%, and as high as 85%. The latter number was published in a Chinese language editorial and not a peer-reviewed scientific journal, however these numbers have taken hold in popular Taiwanese imagination and are treated as facts in Taiwanese politics and identity. Many Taiwanese claim to be part aboriginal. Some Taiwanese graduate biology students expressed skepticism at the findings, noting the lack of peer-reviewed publications. Chen suggests that the estimates resulted from manipulation of sample sizes. The lack of methodological rigor suggests the numbers were meant for local consumption. In all scientific studies, genetic markers for aboriginal ancestry make up a minute portion of the genome. In 2021, Marie Lin, who was the source of the larger indigenous ancestry numbers, co-authored an article stating that East Asian ancestry likely mixed with indigenous peoples in their southward expansion 4,000 years ago, although this does not rule out more recent Taiwanese Han-indigenous admixtures. Han Chinese in mainland China, Han Taiwanese, as well as Chinese Singaporeans all possessed Austronesian-related ancestry. However, only one in five hundred Han Taiwanese individuals examined was genetically closer to the Dusun people, who are closer to the Taiwanese indigenous peoples than Sino-Tibetan populations, and there are "distinct patterns of genetic structure between the Taiwanese Han and indigenous populations."

Immigration history and demographics

There were two major waves of Han immigration: 1) during the Qing dynasty in the 18th and 19th centuries and 2) from Republic of China's mainland area, which is now ruled by the People's Republic of China, in the final years of the Chinese Civil War (1945-1949).

Before Imperial Japanese rule
Taiwan's southwest was home to a Chinese population numbering close to 1,500 before the Dutch first came in 1623. From 1624 to 1662, they began to encourage large-scale Han immigration to the island for labour, mainly from the what is today south Fujian.

Starting from 1683, the Qing government limited immigration to Taiwan. Such restriction was relaxed following the 1760s, and by 1811 there were more than two million ethnic Chinese in Taiwan. The 1926 census counted 3,116,400 and 586,300 Han people originating from the Hok-kien and Kwang-tung provinces (roughly Fujian and Guangdong today) during the Ming or Qing dynasty.

After World War II

Around 800,000 people, the vast majority being Han, immigrated to Taiwan after the end of the World War II, when Republic of China took over Taiwan, with the biggest wave taking place around the founding of the People's Republic of China (PRC) on the mainland in 1949. Since the mid-1990s, there has been a small amount of Han immigration from the PRC into Taiwan. It mainly consists of two categories—brides of businessmen who work on the mainland, and women who have married rural Taiwanese, mostly through a marriage broker.

Around 20% or 34,000 of the Vietnamese people in Taiwan are Hoa people, people of Chinese origin that are mostly Han.

Interactions among Han immigrants

Qing dynasty

Conflicts

There were violent ethnic conflicts (termed "分類械鬥" in government documents of the Qing dynasty), which played a major role in determining the distribution of different groups of Han people in Taiwan. Most conflicts were between people of Zhangzhou and Quanzhou origins which includes acts where Quanzhang fought against Hakka peasants from the southwestern hills of Fujian (Tingzhou and western Zhangzhou) throughout the period. ("漳泉械鬥", Chang-Chin conflicts) and between people of Hokkien and Hakkas origins ("閩粵械鬥" [Min-Yue conflicts]) where Hoklo people united to fight against the Hakka who largely came from Guangdong and a minority from Fujian, is called ("閩客械鬥" [Min-Hakka conflicts]).

Trying to be a mediator, Tēⁿ Iōng-sek (鄭用錫, 10 June 1788 – 21 March 1858), the first Taiwanese to achieve the highest degree, jinshi or "Doctor" (Mandarin: 進士), in the imperial examination of the Qing dynasty, wrote an article On Reconciliation (勸和論).

Cultural assimilation
In some regions, where the majority of the population spoke another language, the minority group sometimes adopted the more dominant language and lost their original language. This most commonly occurred with Hakka migrants, who adopted either Quanzhou or Zhangzhou Hokkien; they are referred to as "minnanized" Hakka people (福佬客).

Republic of China
Unlike pre-World War II, when Han immigrants were predominantly of Hok-kien and Hakka origins, post-World War II Han people came from all over mainland China. Their different languages, habits, ideologies and relationships with the Republic of China government sometimes led to conflicts between these two groups.

Interactions with non-Han inhabitants
In Taiwan, the Han people came into contact with the Austronesians, Dutch, Spanish and Japanese.

Han people and Austronesians
The Amis term for Han people is payrag.

According to the historian Melissa J. Brown, within the Taiwanese Minnan (Hoklo) community itself, differences in culture indicate the degree to which mixture with Austronesians took place, with most pure Hoklo Han in Northern Taiwan having almost no Austronesian admixture, which is limited to Hoklo Han in Southern Taiwan. Plains aborigines who were mixed and assimilated into the Hoklo Han population at different stages were differentiated between "short-route" and "long-route". The ethnic identity of assimilated Plains aboriginals in the immediate vicinity of Tainan was still known since a Taiwanese girl from an old elite Hoklo family was warned by her mother to stay away from them. The insulting name "番仔" (huan-a) was used against plains aborigines by the Taiwanese, and the Hoklo Taiwanese speech was forced upon Aborigines like the Pazeh people. Hoklo Taiwanese has replaced Pazeh and driven it to near extinction. Aboriginal status has been requested by plains aboriginals.

Biological traits and relationships with other Taiwanese/Asian people

Genetic relationships
Part of the maximum-likelihood tree of 75 Asian populations:

Alcohol metabolism
In Taiwan, the prevalence of alcohol dependence among the Han is 10 times lower than that of Austronesians, which is related to genetic, physical, psychological, social, environmental, and cultural factors. An association study by researchers at the Academia Sinica found that genes in alcohol metabolism pathway, especially ADH1B and ALDH2, conferred the major genetic risk for alcohol dependence in Taiwanese Han men.

Languages

The languages used by Han Taiwanese include Mandarin (entire country), Hokkien (Taiwan proper and Kinmen), Hakka (Taiwan proper), Mindong (Matzu), Puxian (Wuqiu Island, Kinmen), and other Han languages spoken by some post-World War II immigrants or immigrants from mainland China since the 1990s. The writing systems used include Han characters, Han phonetic notations such as Mandarin Phonetic Symbols for Mandarin and Taiwanese Phonetic Symbols for Hokkien and Hakka, and the Latin alphabet for various romanization systems, including Tongyong Pinyin, Wade–Giles, Gwoyeu Romatzyh and Mandarin Phonetic Symbols II for Mandarin, POJ and Taiwanese Minnan Romanization System for Hokkien, and Hakka Romanization System for Hakka.

Significant numbers of Puxian Min, Fuzhounese, and Teochew speakers came to Taiwan proper, but they were eventually assimilated into the Hokkien (Minnan) speaking population.

Linguistic Diversity
The Taiwanese linguist Uijin Ang divided Taiwan (excluding Kinmen and Matsu) into 7 linguistic regions, including one Austronesian, five Han and one mixed.

Influence of Non-Han Languages
Ever since the arrival of Han immigrants in Taiwan, their languages have undergone changes through interactions with other Han or non-Han languages. For example, one unit of land area used in Taiwanese Minnan is Kah (0.9699 acre), which comes from the Dutch word for "field", akker (akker >  > ).

Culture

Cuisine

Religion

The most popular religions of Han Taiwanese are Taoism and Buddhism. With 11,796 temples (78.4% Taoist; 19.6% Buddhist), Taiwan is the country with the highest density of temples in the world.

Surnames

Han surnames in Taiwan

In traditional Han society, children inherit the surname of the father. Population analyses of Han Taiwanese based on the short tandem repeat sequences on the Y chromosome, which is specific to males, shows high haplotype diversity in most surname groups. Except for rare ones, the origins of Han surnames in Taiwan are pretty heterogeneous.

Villages
Confucian temples formed an important part of the life of early Han immigrants. Famous temples include Taiwan Confucian Temple and Taipei Confucius Temple.

Written Records/Literature

One of the earliest written records of Taiwanese Hakka is A Tragic Ballad about Hakka Sailing to Taiwan (渡台悲歌), a work written in the Raoping dialect about the life and struggle of Hakka immigrants to Taiwan under the Ching rule.

Folk literature: Tales and Legends
One of the best known Han folktales in Taiwan is the Grandaunt Tiger.

Architecture

Taiwanese architecture refers to a style of buildings constructed by the Han people, and is a branch of Chinese architecture. The style is generally afforded to buildings constructed before the modernization under Japanese occupation, in the 1930s. Different groups of Han immigrants differ in their styles of architecture. Being far away from the center of political power of Beijing, buildings were constructed free of construction standards. This, coupled with inferior level of expertise of artisans and craftsmen, and the Japanese colonization, the architectural style diverged from the ones on the mainland. Many traditional houses have been designated national monuments by the Taiwanese government, such as the Lin Family Mansion and Garden and the House of Tēⁿ Iōng-sek (鄭用錫).

Handicrafts
Hakka Taiwanese have long traditions of indigo dyeing.

The Yilan International Children's Folklore and Folkgame Festival exhibits collections of traditional Han Taiwanese toys.

Arts and Music

Films

See also

Other Taiwanese ethnic groups

Languages of Han Taiwanese

History of Han Taiwanese

Culture of Han Taiwanese

Notes

References

Citations

Sources

External links
Taiwan Folklore & Folk Culture (National Taiwan University OpenCourseWare)

 
Chinese culture in Taiwan